Naihua Duan (born 31 October 1949) is a Taiwanese biostatistician specializing in mental health services and policy research at Columbia University. Duan is a professor of biostatistics (in psychiatry) with tenure in the Departments of Psychiatry and Biostatistics at Columbia University Medical Center, and a senior research scientist at NYSPI.

Duan received a B.S. in mathematics from National Taiwan University, an M.A. in mathematical statistics from Columbia University, and a Ph.D. in statistics from Stanford University.

He is  an elected fellow of the American Statistical Association  and the Institute of Mathematical Statistics.  He has also served as a member of the editorial board for Statistica Sinica and Health Services & Outcomes Research Methodology, and associate editor for the Journal of the American Statistical Association. In addition, he served on a number of national and international panels, such as the Institute of Medicine's Committee on Organ Procurement and Transplantation Policy and Committee on Assessing the Medical Risks of Human Oocyte Donation for Stem Cell Research; the National Research Council’s Committee on Carbon Monoxide Episodes in Meteorological and Topological Problems Areas; and the National Institute of Mental Health’s Behavioral Sciences Workgroup.

References

External links
Duan, N. (no date) A Quest for Evidence Beyond Evidence-Based Medicine: Unleashing Clinical Experience through Evidence Farming. (PDF) Manuscript, University of California, Davis.
 Department of Psychiatry, Columbia University College of Physicians and Surgeons

Taiwanese statisticians
Living people
Biostatisticians
Columbia Graduate School of Arts and Sciences alumni
National Taiwan University alumni
Columbia University faculty
Stanford University alumni
Fellows of the American Statistical Association
Fellows of the Institute of Mathematical Statistics
1949 births
Academic journal editors
20th-century Taiwanese mathematicians
21st-century Taiwanese mathematicians
Taiwanese expatriates in the United States